Harry Lee Biemiller (October 9, 1897 – May 25, 1965) was an American professional baseball player who played two seasons.

Biemiller threw a no-hitter on Opening Day in 1921 as a member of the Jersey City Skeeters of the International League.

References

External links

Baseball players from Baltimore
Washington Senators (1901–1960) players
Cincinnati Reds players
Major League Baseball pitchers
1897 births
1965 deaths
Jersey City Skeeters players
Portland Beavers players
Buffalo Bisons (minor league) players
Columbus Senators players